Nematopogon sericinellus is a moth of the Adelidae family. It is found in mainland Italy and on Sicily.

References

Moths described in 1847
Adelidae
Endemic fauna of Italy
Moths of Europe